General Baquedano was the first training ship of the Chilean Navy ordered specifically for this purpose.

From 1922 to 1926 she was refitted in Talcahuano. She continued to serve as training ship until 1935.

In the literature
Francisco Coloane wrote the novel El último grumete de la Baquedano (The last deckboy of the Baquedano).

References

External links
 Luis Enrique Delano Farewell to the Baquedano in Chilean magazine "Zig Zag"
 Felipe García-Huidobro Correa, Centenario del primer viaje de instrucción de la corbeta General Baquedano 1899-1999

1898 ships
Corvettes of Chile
Training ships
Ships built by Armstrong Whitworth